Strawn is a village in Livingston County, Illinois, United States. The population was 100 at the 2010 census.

Geography
Strawn is located in southeastern Livingston County at  (40.652734, -88.397523).

History

Founding and design of Strawn

Strawn was laid out on 6 June 1873 by David Strawn (1 October 1818 – 25 September 1873). David Strawn had moved to La Salle County, Illinois,  with his family in 1830 from Preble County, Ohio, and in 1835 had settled in South Ottawa Township. He had been elected to the Illinois General Assembly and, by the time the Town of Strawn was platted, he had become a very wealthy land owner. In addition to his La Salle County holdings, Strawn owned thousands of acres in Livingston County. David Strawn never lived in the town that had been named in his honor. The Chicago and Paducah Railroad was at that time being built through Fayette Township in Livingston County. Alfred C. Hueston, the Livingston County Surveyor, laid out the town. He staked out ten blocks on the west side of the tracks, each divided into nine to twenty-four lots. The town was aligned with the railroad tracks rather than in true compass directions. Strawn was unusual because it was designed with a Public Square, a feature common in Illinois towns of the 1830s, but much less so in Illinois towns of the 1870s. Hueston also included a square in his design of the Livingston County town of Cornell laid out in 1871.There was a Depot Ground near the tracks and the station was on the west side of the tracks.

Early events in Strawn

In an effort to attract people to the town, Strawn decided that every alternate lot would be offered free of charge to anyone who would erect a house. The houses had to be of a specified size and they had to be finished quickly; Strawn was emphatic that he did not want "shanties" either as homes or as places of business. E. H. Roberts bought the first lot on the first day they were offered for sale. Many doubted Strawn would be a success. The surrounding area had a reputation for being poorly drained, which prompted the following verses published in the 1878 county history:
 

John Colfer built the first house in Strawn; it was soon converted into a hotel. Roberts also had the distinction of being partner in Aaron, Roberts and Company, the firm that sold the first goods in the town. By 1878 Strawn had eight stores, a harness shop, a blacksmith shop, shoe shops, a grain business and a saloon. A Post Office was established in 1873. On 1 July 1873 the railroad station opened for business. On that day, the first item shipped into Strawn arrived: a barrel of meat bound for the boarding house operated by S.K. Mitchell. Six days later the first freight shipped out of town was sent off: a carload of hogs loaded by Walter D. Strawn, son of the town's founder, who was operating a nearby farm. The first school in Strawn was taught by Sarah Hanagan in the summer of 1873. The Railroad eventually became part of the Wabash system later on the Bloomer Line. Soon after its founding the population of Strawn grew rapidly, but this growth was not sustained.

Demographics

As of the census of 2010, there were 100 people, 40 households, and 25 families residing in the village; there were 46 housing units.

References

External links

Villages in Livingston County, Illinois
Villages in Illinois
Populated places established in 1873
1873 establishments in Illinois